Adam W. Dunsby (born December 11, 1967) is an American businessman, financier and politician. He is a former member of the Connecticut House of Representatives who represented the 135th District, which encompasses Easton, Weston and parts of Redding, between 2017 and 2019. Dunsby, a member of the Republican Party, was also a former First Selectman of Easton between 2013 and 2015.

Early life and education 
Dunsby was born December 11, 1967, in New Jersey. He earned a Bachelor of Science in Business Administration from the University of Pennsylvania in 1990. From 1990 to 1995, he completed a Ph.D. in Finance at the Wharton School of Business.

Career 
From 1995 to 2008, he worked for Cornerstone Quantitative Investment Group, a financial services, asset and fund management company, of which he became a principal. In 2008, he founded and partnered in SummerHaven Investment Management, based in Stamford, Connecticut, an alternative investment management firm. Since 2020, he is co-founder and principal of Mansby Capital, a real estate bridge lending firm, based in New York. Since 2022, he is adjunct professor for finance, at Sacred Heart University in Fairfield, Connecticut.

Politics 
Dunsby began his political career while serving in the municipal legislative, as member of the Easton Conservation Commission from 2003 to 2009, where he served the two final years as chairman. Between 2009 and 2013 he served as an elected member of the Board of Education in his hometown of Easton, Connecticut. In 2013, he narrowly defeated write-in challenger, Valerie J. Buckley, and became First Selectman of Easton. He served in this position until 2015.

In 2016, Dunsby announced to run for the Connecticut House of Representatives, and on November 8, 2016, he defeated Bonnie Troy in the general election and became a member with 7,186 votes (or 53.28%).

Family 
Adam Dunsby is married to Catherine Cathy Dunsby (née Dobson; b. 1968). The couple has four children.

He has been a resident of Easton, Connecticut since 2002.

References 

Living people
Members of the Connecticut House of Representatives
Connecticut Republicans
People from Fairfield County, Connecticut
University of Pennsylvania alumni
Wharton School of the University of Pennsylvania alumni
1967 births